is a passenger railway station located in the town of Ogose, Saitama, Japan, operated by the private railway operator Tōbu Railway.

Lines
During the daytime, the station is served by four trains per hour in each direction.

Station layout
The station consists of a single un-numbered four-car-long side platform serving a bi-directional track.

Adjacent stations

History

The station opened on 16 December 1934.

Platform edge sensors and TV monitors were installed in 2008 ahead of the start of driver-only operation on the Ogose Line from June 2008.

From 17 March 2012, station numbering was introduced on the Tōbu Ogose Line, with Bushū-Karasawa Station becoming "TJ-46".

Passenger statistics
In fiscal 2019, the station was used by an average of 2,978 passengers daily.

Surrounding area

 Ogose Automobile College
 Musashi Ogose High School
 Seiwa Gakuen High School

See also
 List of railway stations in Japan

References

External links

  

Stations of Tobu Railway
Tobu Ogose Line
Railway stations in Saitama Prefecture
Railway stations in Japan opened in 1934
Ogose, Saitama